FK Pelagićevo (Serbian Cyrillic: ФК Пeлaгићeвo) is a football club based in Pelagićevo, Republika Srpska, Bosnia and Herzegovina.

External links
 Pelagićevo municipality official website.

Football clubs in Republika Srpska
Football clubs in Bosnia and Herzegovina
Association football clubs established in 1958
1958 establishments in Bosnia and Herzegovina